Kulob District or Nohiya-i Kulob is a former district in Khatlon Region, Tajikistan. Its capital was Kulob. Around 2018, it was merged into the city of Kulob.

Administrative divisions
The district was divided administratively into jamoats. They were as follows (and population).

Notes

External links
 

Districts of Khatlon Region
Former districts of Tajikistan